Paul Tishman (1900–1996) was a real-estate developer and a collector of African art. Paul Tishman was a member of the long established New York construction and real estate family whose independent development company did major projects in the New York area.

Early life and education
Tishman was born to a Jewish family in 1900, one of five sons of Julius Tishman. In 1921, he graduated from Harvard University. He also did graduate work at the Massachusetts Institute of Technology and Columbia University.

Career
In 1924, Tishman joined the Tishman Realty and Construction Company which was founded by his father in 1898 where he rose to the rank of senior vice president and director. In 1949, he left Tishman Realty and formed his own construction company, Paul Tishman Inc. His company focused on urban renewal and the building of university, hospital, and government buildings. His firm was responsible for the construction of Washington Square Village (although the project was halted due after only two buildings were completed due to local opposition; it was eventually completed by New York University); the Student Art Center at Sarah Lawrence College in Yonkers, the Ravenswood Houses in Astoria, Queens, and Concord Village in Brooklyn. Tishman retired in 1969.

Philanthropy
Tishman served as a director of the Urban League, the Legal Aid Society, the New York League for the Hard of Hearing, and was a member of the visiting committee of the primitive art department at the Metropolitan Museum of Art.

Personal life
Tishman predeceased his wife of 70 years, the former Ruth Worms (1905-1999); two daughters, Ellen Rosenthal and Jean Harrison, and six grandchildren and nine great-grandchildren. Tishman was a collector of African art; his collection was acquired by Walt Disney Productions  In 2005, the Smithsonian National Museum of African Art received the Walt Disney-Tishman Collection of 525 works spanning most major African art styles and 75 cultures.

Allan Sherman parodied Tishman on his last Warner Brothers release (Togetherness, 1967) in the song "If I Were A Tishman" ("All day long I'd buildy-buildy build, if I were a building man...") to the tune of "If I Were a Rich Man" from Fiddler on the Roof.

References

Further reading

1900 births
1996 deaths
American art collectors
Jewish American philanthropists
American real estate businesspeople
Harvard University alumni
20th-century American businesspeople
Tishman family